Butler Chapel A.M.E. Zion Church is a historic African Methodist Episcopal Zion Church built in 1913, and located in Greenville, Alabama. It was one of three significant meeting places for African-Americans living in Greenville during the early-20th century.

The building was added to the National Register of Historic Places in 1986.

History 
This building was a replacement for the original 1867 church structure which had burned down on April 19, 1911. Butler Chapel had served a wide-ranging role as the neighborhood center of economic and social development for many people, including serving as the first African-American school in the city.

References

Methodist churches in Alabama
Churches on the National Register of Historic Places in Alabama
Victorian architecture in Alabama
Churches completed in 1913
Churches in Butler County, Alabama
Greenville, Alabama
1913 establishments in Alabama
National Register of Historic Places in Butler County, Alabama